Jefferson is a city in, and the county seat of Greene County, Iowa, United States, along the North Raccoon River. The population was 4,182 at the time of the 2020 census. The tower is named for Floyd Mahanay, a businessman, philanthropist, and former resident. Jefferson is bisected east to west by the old Lincoln Highway (formerly U.S. 30). A new U.S. Route 30 is located approximately one mile to the north.

History
While platted and settled a few years earlier, "New Jefferson" was organized in the winter of 1855–56 and officially incorporated in January 1872. It began as a farming community and remains so today. The first settlers of the new city were the family of George S. Walton who built there in 1855.  During the Civil War, Jefferson as well as Greene County contributed its sons to raising Company H, 10th Iowa Infantry (1861) and Company E, 39th Iowa Infantry (1862). The railway came to Jefferson in the decades after the Civil War. Jefferson's first mayor was Mahlon Head, elected in 1872. Jefferson's library was completed in 1904 through the generosity of the Carnegie library fund. The stretch of Lincoln Highway that runs through Jefferson was completed .

Geography

Wikipedia Climate Data Format

Climate

According to the Köppen Climate Classification system, Jefferson has a hot-summer humid continental climate, abbreviated "Dfa" on climate maps.

Demographics

2010 census
As of the census of 2010, there were 4,345 people, 1,900 households, and 1,172 families living in the city. The racial makeup of the city was 97.9% White, 0.1% African American, 0.1% Native American, 0.2% Asian, 1.0% from other races, and 0.7% from two or more races. Hispanic or Latino of any race were 2.3% of the population.

There were 1,900 households, of which 26.5% had children under the age of 18 living with them, 47.9% were married couples living together, 9.8% had a female householder with no husband present, 3.9% had a male householder with no wife present, and 38.3% were non-families. 34.8% of all households were made up of individuals, and 20% had someone living alone who was 65 years of age or older. The average household size was 2.21 and the average family size was 2.81.

The median age in the city was 46.3 years. 22.5% of residents were under the age of 18; 6.4% were between the ages of 18 and 24; 19.3% were from 25 to 44; 27.5% were from 45 to 64; and 24.2% were 65 years of age or older. The gender makeup of the city was 47.4% male and 52.6% female.

2000 census
As of the census of 2000, there were 4,626 people, 1,954 households, and 1,234 families living in the city. The racial makeup of the city was 97.97% White, 0.15% African American, 0.24% Native American, 0.39% Asian, 0.02% Pacific Islander, 0.61% from other races, and 0.63% from two or more races. Hispanic or Latino of any race were 1.73% of the population.

There were 1,954 households, out of which 28.1% had children under the age of 18 living with them, 51.5% were married couples living together, 8.6% had a female householder with no husband present, and 36.8% were non-families. 33.7% of all households were made up of individuals, and 20.9% had someone living alone who was 65 years of age or older. The average household size was 2.26 and the average family size was 2.88.

Age spread: 23.7% under the age of 18, 5.9% from 18 to 24, 22.9% from 25 to 44, 21.1% from 45 to 64, and 26.4% who were 65 years of age or older. The median age was 43 years. For every 100 females, there were 83.8 males. For every 100 females age 18 and over, there were 78.4 males.

The median income for a household in the city was $32,818, and the median income for a family was $42,754. Males had a median income of $32,206 versus $21,359 for females. The per capita income for the city was $17,441. About 3.3% of families and 7.3% of the population were below the poverty line, including 7.6% of those under age 18 and 7.7% of those age 65 or over.

Arts and culture

Mahanay Memorial Bell Tower 
However, the funds were not sufficient to provide for a full carillon of bells on top. In 2016, upon the 50th anniversary of the tower being built, $440,905 funds were acquired to add a four-octave, 47-bell carillon at the top of the tower. The bells are expected to be chiming the summer of 2017 and will be operated by a digital piano to give tunes for weddings, birthdays, funerals and even the local high school's fight song after games. For many years, the tower provides the current time with a recording of the Westminster Chimes. An elevator in the tower takes visitors to the observation deck which overlooks five Iowa counties. As of 2016, there were more than seventeen other buildings in Iowa taller than the Mahanay Tower: 12 in Des Moines, 3 in Cedar Rapids, and 2 in Davenport.

Festivals 
Since 1980 annually on the second Saturday of June, the Bell Tower Festival has a parade in the morning and a street dance in the evening.

In popular culture 
Jefferson is mentioned in Star Trek: Discovery, Season 01, Episode 05, "Choose Your Pain" as "our new classified facility".

Education
Residents are in the Greene County Community School District, which operates Greene County Elementary, Greene County Middle, and Greene County High schools in Jefferson.

It was part of the Jefferson School District until July 1, 1992, when that district merged into the Jefferson–Scranton Community School District. It was a part of Jefferson–Scranton until it merged into the Greene County district on July 1, 2014.

Notable people

Johnny Case – Professional mixed martial artist
George Gallup – Developer of the Gallup poll
William Cook Hanson – Federal District Judge (Southern Dist. of Iowa) appointed by Pres. John F. Kennedy; Federal Bench 1962–95
Darrell R. Lindsey – Posthumous recipient of the Medal of Honor
Dick Oatts – Jazz saxophonist
Bryce Paup – Professional football player (1990–2000)
Loren Shriver – Astronaut
Randy Weaver - Participant in Ruby Ridge standoff
Doreen Wilber – Gold Medal winner in archery at the 1972 Olympics

See also

 George H. Gallup House
 Greene County Courthouse
 Raccoon River Valley Trail

References

Further reading
 Stillman, B.B., Past and Present of Greene County, Iowa, Chicago: S.J. Clarke Publishing Co., 1907 (1979 reprint)
 Franzwa, Gregory M., The Lincoln Highway, Iowa (Vol. 1), Tucson: The Patrice Press, 1995.
 Bogue, Allan G., From Prairie to Cornbelt, Farming on the Illinois and Iowa Prairies in the Nineteenth Century, Chicago: University of Chicago Press, 1963.

External links

City website

 
Cities in Iowa
Cities in Greene County, Iowa
County seats in Iowa
Populated places established in 1855
1855 establishments in Iowa